John Church may refer to:

Politicians
John Barker Church (1748–1818), American financier, briefly an MP in the UK Parliament
John Church (MP for Leicester), see Leicester (UK Parliament constituency)
John Church (politician) (1859–1937), Australian politician

Others
John Church (clergyman) (1780–c. 1835), clergyman involved in the homosexual scandal of the Vere Street Coterie
John Church (footballer) (1919–2004), English footballer
John H. Church (1892–1953), U.S. Army officer